Glyptotek or Glyptothek may refer to:

 Ny Carlsberg Glyptotek, an art museum in Copenhagen, Denmark
 Glyptothek, an art museum in Munich, Germany
 Glyptothek (album), an album by Scottish musician Momus